The 1999 Grand Prix motorcycle racing season was the 51st F.I.M. Road Racing World Championship season.

Season summary
The dominant reign of Honda's Mick Doohan came to an end with serious injuries suffered in practice for the Spanish Grand Prix. In his absence, his Honda teammate Àlex Crivillé stepped forward and claimed Spain's first-ever 500cc world championship. Kenny Roberts Jr. gave a strong performance to finish in second with four victories including an outright victory over Doohan in Japan.

A young Valentino Rossi continued to impress for Aprilia, winning nine races and claiming his second world championship, this time in the 250 class. Honda's Emilio Alzamora became only the second rider to win a world championship without winning a race when he captured the 125 crown from Marco Melandri and Masao Azuma who split five victories between them.

1999 Grand Prix season calendar
The following Grands Prix were scheduled to take place in 1999:

†† = Saturday race

Calendar changes
 The Japanese Grand Prix and Malaysian Grand Prix swapped places, with Malaysia hosting the opening round Grand Prix, instead of Japan.
 The Malaysian Grand Prix was moved from Johor to the newly built Sepang International Circuit.
 The Madrid Grand Prix was taken off the calendar, in favour of the newly built Circuit Ricardo Tormo, which would host the first Valencian Grand Prix this year.
 Both the South African Grand Prix and Rio de Janeiro Grand Prix were added to the calendar. The Rio Grand Prix was removed last year due to organisational problems, whilst South Africa had not been in the calendar since 1992. The race back then, was held at Kyalami. 
 The Japanese motorcycle Grand Prix moved from Suzuka Circuit to the new Twin Ring Motegi circuit due to lack of the bids.

1999 Grand Prix season results

†† = Saturday race

Participants

500cc participants

Standings

Riders' standings

500cc

Scoring system
Points were awarded to the top fifteen finishers. A rider had to finish the race to earn points.

250cc

Scoring system
Points were awarded to the top fifteen finishers. A rider had to finish the race to earn points.

125cc

Scoring system
Points were awarded to the top fifteen finishers. A rider had to finish the race to earn points.

Manufacturers' standings

500cc

250cc

125cc

References
 Büla, Maurice & Schertenleib, Jean-Claude (2001). Continental Circus 1949-2000. Chronosports S.A. 

Grand Prix motorcycle racing seasons
Grand Prix motorcycle racing season